Nhlapo or Nhlapho is a South African surname that may refer to:

Sabelo Nhlapo (born 1988), South African rugby union player
Sifiso Nhlapo, South African racing cyclist 
Siyabonga Nhlapo (born 1988), South African football midfielder 
Tumelo Nhlapo (born 1988), South African football defender